The 2010 New Zealand Grand Prix was an open wheel racing car race held at Manfeild Autocourse, near Feilding on 14 February 2010.

It was the fifty-fifth New Zealand Grand Prix and was open to Toyota Racing Series cars. The event was also the third race of the fourth round of the 2010 Toyota Racing Series.

Classification

Qualifying

Race

References

External links
 Toyota Racing Series

New Zealand Grand Prix
Grand
Toyota Racing Series
February 2010 sports events in New Zealand